Argobuccinum is a genus of predatory sea snails, marine gastropod mollusks in the family Cymatiidae.

Species
Species within the genus Argobuccinum include:
 Argobuccinum pustulosum (Lightfoot, 1786) - synonym: Argobuccinum tumidum (Dunker, 1862)

Species brought into synonymy
 Argobuccinum magellanicus (Röding, 1798): synonym of Fusitriton magellanicus (Röding, 1798)
 Argobuccinum murrayi E. A. Smith, 1891: synonym of Fusitriton murrayi (E. A. Smith, 1891)
 Argobuccinum proditor  (Frauenfeld, 1865): synonym of Argobuccinum pustulosum (Lightfoot, 1786) 
 Argobuccinum retiolus Hedley, 1914: synonym of Fusitriton retiolus (Hedley, 1914)
 Argobuccinum rude (Broderip, 1833): synonym of Priene scabrum (King, 1832)
 Argobuccinum scabrum (King, 1832): synonym of Priene scabrum (King, 1832)
 Argobuccinum ranelliforme (King, 1832): synonym of Argobuccinum pustulosum (Lightfoot, 1786)
 Argobuccinum tristanense Dell, 1963: synonym of Argobuccinum proditor  (Frauenfeld, 1865)

References

 Vaught, K.C. (1989). A classification of the living Mollusca. American Malacologists: Melbourne, FL (USA). . XII, 195 pp

Cymatiidae